Antti Kalliomäki (born 8 January 1947) is a Finnish politician and former athlete. Kalliomäki is a member of the Social Democratic Party of Finland (SDP) and was a member of the Parliament of Finland from 1983 until 2011. He retired from politics in 2011.

Politics
He served as Minister of Trade and Industry in the first Lipponen cabinet from 1995 to 1999. Kalliomäki was the Deputy Prime Minister and the head of SDP ministerial group in Jäätteenmäki and first Vanhanen cabinets. He hold the posts of Minister of Finance from April 2003 to September 2005 until he was replaced by the new Chairman of SDP, Eero Heinäluoma. Kalliomäki continued in the cabinet as the Minister of Education from September 2005 to April 2007.

Kalliomäki was the chairman of the SDP parliamentary group from March 1991 to April 1995 and again from March 1999 until April 2003. In municipal politics, Kallomäki was member of Vantaa city council 1984–2000 and was in the municipal council of Nurmijärvi from 2005 until his retirement.

Athletics
Before his political career, Kalliomäki was a successful athlete and won the silver medal in pole vault at the 1976 Summer Olympics in Montreal and participated also in the 1972 and 1980 Olympic Games. His personal record is 566 cm.

International competitions

1No mark in the final

References

External links
 
 Official home page 

1947 births
Living people
People from Siikainen
Social Democratic Party of Finland politicians
Deputy Prime Ministers of Finland
Ministers of Finance of Finland
Ministers of Education of Finland
Ministers of Trade and Industry of Finland
Members of the Parliament of Finland (1983–87)
Members of the Parliament of Finland (1987–91)
Members of the Parliament of Finland (1991–95)
Members of the Parliament of Finland (1995–99)
Members of the Parliament of Finland (1999–2003)
Members of the Parliament of Finland (2003–07)
Members of the Parliament of Finland (2007–11)
Finnish sportsperson-politicians
Finnish male pole vaulters
Athletes (track and field) at the 1972 Summer Olympics
Athletes (track and field) at the 1976 Summer Olympics
Athletes (track and field) at the 1980 Summer Olympics
Olympic athletes of Finland
Olympic silver medalists for Finland
European Athletics Championships medalists
Medalists at the 1976 Summer Olympics
Olympic silver medalists in athletics (track and field)